Enterprise Florida, Inc. (EFI) is a public–private partnership between Florida’s business and government leaders and is the principal economic development organization for the state of Florida. EFI’s mission is to expand and diversify the state’s economy through job creation. In pursuit of its mission, EFI works closely with a statewide network of economic development partners  and is funded both by the State of Florida and by private-sector businesses.

History 
In 1978, the responsibilities of the Florida Department of Commerce were split with the Department of Labor and Employment Security.
 
In 1996, under Governor Lawton Chiles, Florida became the first state in the nation to place principal responsibility for economic development, international trade, research and marketing in the hands of a business-government partnership. Motivating the move was the belief that, with hands-on participation by Florida businesses, Florida could develop into a sophisticated economy driven by diverse industries and international business. States across the nation have gone on to adopt this successful model.

As a public-private partnership of business and government leaders, EFI is changing the landscape of economic development in Florida.

EFI is advancing the forefront of economic development in Florida. As a public-private partnership of business and government leaders, our goal is to promote Florida as a premier business destination and expand the state’s economy through private-sector job creation. In pursuit of this mission, EFI works closely with a statewide network of economic development partners.

EFI serves as the state’s primary entity for trade and export development supporting more than 60,000 Florida exporting businesses. The organization also assists small and minority businesses through its capital programs, supports Florida’s defense industry through the Florida Defense Alliance and Florida Defense Support Task Force, and champions sport industry growth through the Florida Sport Foundation.

Leadership 

The Enterprise Florida, Inc. (EFI) Board of Directors comprises 59 members representing businesses, government and other institutions in Florida. Governor Ron DeSantis serves the Board as an Appointed/Statute as the Governor, State of Florida and is the current Chairman.

With the creation of EFI, Florida became the first state to convert its Department of Commerce into a 501(c)(3) public-private partnership in which business has a leadership role. As such, EFI’s Board of Directors voting members represent Florida businesses, trade organizations, educational institutions, governments and economic development organizations. Just as businesses and citizens strengthen their communities through volunteerism, EFI’s board members do the same by participating in job creation efforts on behalf of the state.

On January 7, 2019, Jamal Sowell was named President & CEO of Enterprise Florida, Inc. (EFI).

Key services 
EFI's goal is to expand and diversify Florida's economy through job creation. In support of this mission, EFI:
 Recruits companies from all over the world to locate in Florida
 Assists with the expansion of established businesses in Florida
 Facilitates international trade and exporting
 Provides capital funding programs to assist small and minority businesses
 Advocates for the protection of Florida's military bases
 Promotes professional and amateur sporting events throughout the state

A public-private partnership 
EFI was created in statute by the Florida Legislature as a public-private organization. A  Board of Directors  oversees the organization, composed of appointed members representing Florida corporations. In addition, each member of the Florida Cabinet holds a position on the board. Florida Governor Ron DeSantis serves as the Chairman of EFI’s Board of Directors.

Competitive project business development 
In collaboration with 67 statewide economic development offices, community leaders, utility partners and other local affiliates, EFI confidentially assists companies with their location, relocation and expansion plans by providing site selection services, demographic information, incentive information, etc. EFI’s job creation efforts focus on a wide range of industry sectors, including life sciences, information technology, aviation & aerospace, defense & homeland security, financial & professional services, manufacturing, clean energy and beyond.

International trade and development 
Florida is home to more than 60,000 exporters, the second highest number in the United States. EFI's stated mission is to assist Florida businesses in expanding into the international marketplace by providing export counseling and advice, conducting overseas trade missions and trade shows, offering financial assistance for international event attendance, as well as research and reports to facilitate the export process.

Enterprise Florida maintains a network of 14 International Offices in 13 countries whose markets offer important trade and/or investment opportunities for Florida. Twelve full-service offices provide assistance to Florida companies that want to sell their products and services in these markets: Brazil, Canada (Toronto and Montreal), France, Germany, Hong Kong, Israel, Japan, Mexico, South Africa, Spain, and the U.K. They also play a critical role in representing Florida overseas and attracting foreign investment to the state. Pro bono offices in the Czech Republic and Taiwan provide limited services to Florida exporters interested in those markets.

Small business capital programs 
Enterprise Florida, Inc.’s (EFI) Minority & Small Business, Entrepreneurship and Capital (MaSBEC) division partners with outside organizations to provide small, minority and entrepreneurial companies with training, development and financing options. EFI has a network of state, federal and non-profit resources with the stated purpose of helping small businesses to access capital, enter new markets, and create revenue growth and job creation.

Florida Defense Alliance 
Florida Defense Alliance (FDA)  was created in 1998 as a non-profit partnership between the Governor, Florida state officials, the Florida Congressional Delegation, state legislators, base commanders and staff, community leaders, and business executives. FDA's mission is to increase military value, enhance base capabilities, and promote multi-service synergies for Florida’s military bases, while supporting and enhancing the quality of life of Florida military families.

Florida Sports Foundation 
In 2011, Florida Sports Foundation (FSF)  joined the EFI team. FSF's mission is to assist Florida’s communities with securing, hosting and retaining Sporting events and sports related business to generate economic impact and tourism through the Foundation’s grant programs, legislative initiatives and Industry Partner service, recognition and development. FSF also provides the citizens of Florida with participation opportunities in Florida’s Sunshine State Games and Florida Senior Games events and assists in the promotion of targeted leisure sports industries in Florida.

References

External links 
 EnterpriseFlorida.com
 Florida Department of Economic Opportunity
 CareerSource Florida
 Space Florida
 Visit Florida
 MyFlorida.com
 Florida Chamber of Commerce

State departments of economic development in the United States